Inboden is a surname. Notable people with the surname include:

Mary Hollis Inboden (born 1986), American actress and writer
William Inboden (born 1972), American academic, writer, and former White House staffer

See also
Imboden (surname)